Kanagae Sanbee in historical sources, was a Japanese potter who is said to have moved from Korea. He is often considered the father of Arita ware porcelain, although the narrative is today questioned by historians. He is honored in Sueyama Shrine of Arita as the father of Arita ware.

Popular narrative 
Although there is no doubt that Kanagae Sanbee actually existed, almost no contemporary source mentions him. The story of "Yi Sam-pyeong" as seen today was gradually developed by the late 19th century by various parties with various intentions. As an example, here is introduced the story presented by Kanagae Sanbee XIV, a descendant of Kanagae Sanbee concerned.

Toyotomi Hideyoshi's campaign against Korea (1592–98) triggered great progress in Japanese pottery as hundreds of artisans were brought to Japan to encourage technological development. Yi Sam-pyeong is one of the best known potters from Korea.

According to some records of the Kanagae family, he lived for a short period of time in the town of Saga, which was ruled by Nabeshima Naoshige, the de facto founder of the Saga Domain in Kyushu. He was then given to Taku Yasutoshi, the ruler of Taku in central Saga, where he started a pottery but did not succeed. He searched for kaolin, and eventually in 1616 he discovered a kaolin deposit on the Izumi Mountain in Arita, effectively starting the porcelain industry in Japan. For his achievements, he was allowed to take the Japanese name Kanagae Sanbee after his home town Geumgang.

The real Kanagae Sanbee 
The popular narrative was questioned by the Japanese historian Nakamura Tadashi in 1992. The stories of founding fathers of early modern pottery including Yi Sam-pyeong's are not confirmed by contemporary sources but were formed as late as the second half of the 18th century. Komiya Kiyora further analyzed the origin of the narrative, largely dismissing it.

No contemporary Korean source mentioned him. In fact, historical sources, all in Japanese, never refer to him as Yi Sam-pyeong. The alleged Korean name was coined in the late 19th century, as described below. No contemporary source claims that he was hunted for his talent during the Korean campaign, or even that he took part in pottery in Korea. It is as late as circa 1843 that the official documents of the Saga Domain started to claim that the virtual founder of the domain Nabeshima Naoshige brought six or seven talented potters as "living treasures of Japan." This account was taken from a biography of a local governor of western Saga including Arita, written by his son Yamamoto Tsunetomo in 1707. The historical accuracy of his account is questionable as a mountain, where artisans supposedly started pottery, has no known remains of kilns. These records made no mention of Kanagae Sanbee or the names of other potters.

The earliest known source of Kanagae Sanbee was of circa 1653, more than half a century after his arrival in Japan and only few years before his death. It was written by Kanagae Sanbee himself and given to Taku, the ruling family of the region of Taku. In this memorandum, he claimed that after the arrival in Japan, he had taken service with Taku Yasutoshi "for few years," and then had moved with some 18 people, mostly children, from Taku to Arita in 1616. It is not clear how he earned his living for nearly 20 years, between the end of his service and the supposed migration of 1616. A more interesting fact is that he did not claim that he had been a potter before his arrival or brought to Japan for his talent. He claimed that he carried (kiln) cars in his supposed migration of 1616. Also he noted that his men had included three of the "original potters of Taku" (多久本皿屋), whose identity is unclear.

The historian Komiya Kiyora points to the existence of earlier pottery even before the Korean campaign of 1592-98. A considerable number of Korean potters were patronized by the Hata clan of Karatsu in northern Saga, who was destroyed by Toyotomi Hideyoshi in 1593. It is known that the kilns in its territory subsequently disappeared. Apparently potters became refugees because the war prevented them from returning to Korea. Komiya presumes that the "original potters of Taku" were one of these refugee groups and that Kanagae Sanbee learned pottery from them for survival.

Komiya also questions his alleged discovery of a kaolin deposit in Arita and its supposed date of 1616 since the earliest known porcelain from Arita is of the 1630s and 40s. He points to the fact that the Saga domain tried for a short period of time to launch gold and silver mining. He raised the possibility that the thorough search for the ore body might have resulted in the discovery of kaolin.

Komiya presumes that in 1616 Kanagae Sanbee was actually "banished" from Taku. It is confirmed by historical sources that authorities frequently cast out potters. As pottery was accompanied by forest destruction, they faced serious conflicts of interest with farmers. Early potteries were not profitable enough for authorities to protect because they were poor articles for daily use and lacked artistic merit. It seems around the 1630s that technological innovation enabled them to produce profitable, Chinese-like ceramics, and as a result, they got exempted from banishment.

Development of the narrative 
Komiya further analyzed historical sources in chronological order to explain how the narrative of Yi Sam-pyeong has been developed.

An appeal, dated 1770, from the Kanagae family to the Taku family shows an early form of the foundation myth. The purpose of the appeal was to overturn the Taku family's decision to stop giving small salary to the Kanagae family, and thus they attempted to glory the achievement of their ancestor and to claim his close tie with the Taku family. According to the appeal, Kanagae Sanbee was brought to Japan by Nabeshima Naoshige and served him as a story teller for several years. He expressed his hope of becoming a potter. As a result, he became a retainer of Taku Yasutoshi and moved to Arita to start porcelain. The appeal claimed the foundation of Arita porcelain to be solely attributed to Kanagae Sanbee, but admitted that no one in Arita "remembered" his achievement at that time. Also this is the first known source that claimed the original surname of Kanagae Sanbee to be Ri (李, Yi).

A memorandum (1784 or 1796) added one more achievement by him: during the Korean campaign in 1592-98, Kanagae Sanbee is said to have risked his life to guide the Nabeshima army. An appeal of circa 1807, again to the Taku family, further expanded the story: He served Nabeshima Naoshige as a navigator during the Korean campaign. It was Nabeshima Naoshige who invited him to Japan for fear that otherwise he would be revenged. It was at this time that he "revealed" his family business of pottery to Nabeshima Naoshige, and he was allowed to continue his business in Japan. As a result of the modification, the memorandum dropped the earlier claim of his supposed service to Nabeshima Naoshige as a story teller. Still, the memorandum admitted that he had not immediately started pottery but that all he could do for early years was to survive his life in the undeveloped region. The use of the name Sanpei (三平, or Sam-pyeong) may be worth mentioning. It is uncertain whether this is indeed his original name or just "Koreanization" of his Japanese name Sanbee (三兵衛).

The above documents were presented by the Kanagae family. Historical sources reveal that there were several other families around Arita that have similar and mutually conflicting foundation myths. The unification of these foundation myths into that of Kanagae Sanbee occurred during the Meiji era, or the late 19th century. In the early Meiji era, people of Arita had no consensus on the history, and the origin in particular, of Arita porcelain. The first publication known to spread the myth nationwide was of 1877, which copied the story of the Kanagae family but used the alleged Korean name of Yi Sam-pyeong. In the 1880s several attempts were made in Arita to build a unified view, and during this process, the story of Kanagae Sanbee, now Yi Sam-pyeong, survived as the most influential one. The hegemony was reaffirmed in 1917 when a monument titled "Monument for the Father of Porcelain Yi Sam-pyeong" was built in Sueyama Shrine of Arita.

References

Korean artists
Japanese potters
Korean pottery
1655 deaths
Japanese people of Korean descent
Year of birth unknown
Place of birth unknown